The 2004 Finnish Figure Skating Championships took place between January 3 and 4, 2004 in Vantaa. Skaters competed in the disciplines of men's singles, women's singles, and ice dancing on the senior and junior levels. The event was used to help determine the Finnish team to the 2004 European Championships.

Senior results

Men

Ladies

Ice dancing

External links
 results

Finnish Figure Skating Championships, 2004
Finnish Figure Skating Championships
2004 in Finnish sport